Zelzal (meaning "Earthquake") is a series of artillery rockets developed by Iran. The series consists of:

Zelzal-1, with an estimated range of 
Zelzal-2, with an estimated range of 
Zelzal-3, with an estimated range of 

These rockets were developed by Hassan Tehrani Moghaddam following development the Shahab-1 and Shahab-2.

See also
Aerospace Force of the Islamic Revolutionary Guard Corps
Armed Forces of the Islamic Republic of Iran
Defense industry of Iran
Equipment of the Iranian Army
Fateh-110

References 

Rocket artillery
Artillery of Iran